Mirpur is a village located in the Sirohi District of Rajasthan, India. It was known historically as Hamirapura.

The village is also known for its Jain tirtha called Mirpur Jain Temple.

References 

Villages in Sirohi district